S Storm is a 2016 Hong Kong-Chinese crime action thriller film directed by David Lam and starring Louis Koo, Julian Cheung and Vic Chou. The film was released in China by Huace Pictures on September 14, 2016 and in Hong Kong on September 15, 2016.

It is the second installment in a pentalogy, preceded by Z Storm (2014) and succeeded by L Storm (2018), P Storm (2019) and G Storm (2021).

Plot
While he is tailing a Jockey Club football betting trader in his investigation, ICAC Principal Investigator William Luk of the ICAC witnesses the murder of the trader by a lone assassin Song Yan-sheun.

Inspector Lau Po-keung of the Serious Crime Unit is assigned to the murder case but gets nowhere with Luk's testimony as Luk refuses to disclose anything pertaining to his own investigation. Despite pressure from his boss to leave the ICAC to their investigation, Lau instead suggests to Luk that they work together to solve the case.

The Police investigation leads to someone called Teacher, the biggest player who controls the illegal bookmaking on football betting in Hong Kong. They intercept some instructions that Teacher sent to the assassin Song. Lau is in hot pursuit of Song, but he escapes by using Lau's sister, Ebby. Terry Lun, the Security Manager of the Jockey Club also encounters suspicious bank transactions, but is murdered by Song.

Big Boss, a British national and the mastermind behind an international crime syndicate who manipulates football matches in Europe, tries to destroy evidence linking him to the match fixing. He becomes suspicious and orders Teacher to be assassinated and also hires someone to assassinate Song. Big Boss forces Lau to give up evidence linking him to match fixing by kidnapping Ebby and force an exchange. Lau leaves hints to his subordinates and to Luk as to where the exchange will take place. Lau arrives on scene first but encounters several foreign henchmen employed by Big Boss. This leads to a shoot out where Lau kills a henchmen but is critically wounded saving Ebby from being executed. Luk and his team shortly arrive but are pinned down by an assault rifle wielding henchman. Song then arrives on scene to get revenge on Big Boss killing several henchmen but is killed the assault rifle wielding henchman who is then flanked and shot dead by Luk. Big Boss attempts to flee the chaos but is cornered and captured by Luk's team. After recovering the evidence, together, Luk is able to arrest Big Boss's partner  Ha Chi Yin (Shek Sau), one of the directors of the Jockey Club who is the shoo-in candidate as the next Chairman.

Cast
Louis Koo as William Luk
Julian Cheung as Lau Po-keung
Vic Chou as Song Yan-sheun
Ada Choi as Wong Man-ling
Bowie Lam as Terry Lun
Dada Chan as Ebby Lau
Janelle Sing as Tammy Tam
Lo Hoi-pang as Sun Wah-shan
Derek Tsang as Joe Ma
Jacky Cai as Lily Li
Jenny Xu as Tall Girl
Song Haijie as Liu Hang
Sam Chan as Ballman
Deon Cheung as Siu Leung
Alan Luk as Choi
Jones Lee as Fork

Special appearance
Shek Sau as Ha Chi-yin

Guest appearance
Philip Keung as Bill Tang
Joe Cheung as Board member of China Company
Joseph Tay as Daniel
Kwok Fung as Chief Inspector of Police
Terence Yin as Tang Siu-hung
Jan Tse as Master of Ceremony

Reception
The film grossed  at the Chinese box office.

Sequel

The film is followed by a sequel, L Storm, released on 23 August 2018 in Hong Kong.

References

External links

S Storm at HKCinemagic

2016 crime action films
Chinese action thriller films
Chinese crime thriller films
Hong Kong action thriller films
Hong Kong crime thriller films
Hong Kong crime action films
Hong Kong detective films
Police detective films
2016 crime thriller films
2016 action thriller films
Films directed by David Lam
Independent Commission Against Corruption (Hong Kong)
Hong Kong sequel films
2010s Cantonese-language films
2010s Hong Kong films